Vito John Fossella Jr. (born March 9, 1965) is an American politician serving as the Staten Island Borough President since 2022. A member of the Republican Party, Fossella previously represented the state's 13th congressional district in the U.S. House of Representatives for six terms, from 1997 to 2009 serving as the lone Republican from New York City. A Staten Island native, Fossella initially took office in 1997, after winning a special election held to replace the resigning Susan Molinari.

After a DUI arrest in Alexandria, Virginia on May 1, 2008, it was discovered that he was living with Laura Fay, a retired US Air Force lieutenant colonel, while Fossella was married.  The two had a child together and were living in Virginia as a married couple while he was living in Staten Island with his wife. He announced on his official website on May 20 that he had chosen to serve out the remainder of his term, which ended on January 3, 2009, but decided not to run for re-election.

In March 2021, Fossella announced that he was running for Borough President of Staten Island. He was endorsed by Donald Trump and won the Republican nomination in July 2021. He was elected borough president after defeating opponents Mark Murphy and Leticia Remauro.

Early life, education, and family 
Fossella was born on Staten Island into a Roman Catholic family of Irish and Italian descent. Fossella's great-grandfather James A. O'Leary represented Staten Island in Congress from 1935 to 1944. One of his uncles, Frank Fossella, was a prominent Staten Island Democrat who was a City Council member in 1985. His father, Vito John Fossella Sr., served in various appointed positions in the city administrations of Democratic Mayors Edward I. Koch and Abraham D. Beame, then became a successful construction engineer.

Fossella, the fourth of seven children, was a basketball player at Monsignor Farrell High School, where he got his first political experience in the student council. He briefly played violin and percussion with the Christian pop band Sonseed. He attended Iona College in New Rochelle, then transferred to the Wharton School of the University of Pennsylvania, where he received a Bachelor of Science degree in economics in 1987.  At Penn, he was a member of the Sigma Phi Epsilon fraternity.

After college, Fossella worked as a management consultant at the accounting firm Deloitte & Touche. Deloitte Touche Tohmatsu was the second largest campaign contributor to Fossella in the 2006 campaign cycle and among the largest contributors in the 2008 campaign cycle.

Fossella then attended law school. He received a Juris Doctor from the Fordham University School of Law in 1993, and worked as an associate at a medical malpractice defense law firm Schiavetti Begos & Nicholson.

In 1990, Fossella married Mary Patricia Rowan. They have three children and live in the Great Kills neighborhood on Staten Island. Fossella also had a daughter out-of-wedlock in 2005 with retired Lt. Col. Laura Fay.

New York City Council

Early political work; election 
Fossella was a political protégé of Michael J. Petrides, a member of the city's School Board and a Staten Island political strategist. In 1990, Fossella changed his voter registration from the Democratic Party to become the family's first Republican. "I found myself voting more and more for Republicans," he said in 1997. "For the most part, my family reacted well. But still, I would love to have been a fly on the wall." Under Petrides' guidance, he joined the 1992 re-election campaign of Staten Island Congresswoman Susan Molinari and, in 1993, the mayoral campaign of Rudy Giuliani.

Fossella's political career began in April 1994, when he won a special election to the New York City Council, representing Staten Island's South Shore and Mid-Island section. He replaced Councilman Alfred C. Cerullo III, who had left to become Commissioner of Consumer Affairs in the Rudy Giuliani administration. Fossella spent $92,000 in the election, in which he had five opponents.

In November 1994, Fossella was reelected to the remaining three years of Cerullo's term, defeating Democrat Rosemarie Mangano. He served on the Council until November 1997.

Council initiatives 
Fossella's council initiatives included:

 Authoring the legislation that led to the agreement to permanently close the Fresh Kills Landfill
 Conceiving the idea of the South Richmond Rezoning Study, a comprehensive rezoning initiative on Staten Island
 Securing funding for the construction of P.S. 56 and P.S. 6, the first new schools to be built on Staten Island in over a decade.

United States Congress

Initial election 
In June 1997, Fossella was selected by executive committee of the Staten Island Republican Party as its candidate to run for the Congressional seat being vacated by Representative Susan Molinari. 
Fossella won the special election in November 1997, defeating Democratic Assemblyman Eric Vitaliano with 61 percent of the vote.

Re-elections 
In November 1998, Fossella won a full term with 68 percent of the vote. He was re-elected in 2000, winning 65 percent of the vote against Democrat Katina M. Johnstone even as Al Gore carried the district. In 2002, he was re-elected with 70 percent of the vote, defeating Democrat Arne M. Mattsson.
 
In 2004, Fossella faced his first close contest against former state assemblyman and judge Frank J. Barbaro. Barbaro actually won the Brooklyn portion of the district by seven points, the first time Fossella had not won that area; Barbaro had represented much of this area in Albany for 23 years. However, Barbaro performed poorly on Staten Island, and Fossella won there by 26 points—enough for him to win a fourth full term with 59% of the vote districtwide. Some have speculated that he was helped by George W. Bush's 13-point win on Staten Island.

Fossella was considered a possible challenger to Mayor Michael Bloomberg in the 2005 election, but he chose not to make the race.

In 2006, incumbent Fossella defeated Democrat Steve Harrison, a relatively unknown Brooklyn attorney, by a margin of 56.7%-43.3%.

2008 election 
Before Fossella announced that he would not run in 2008, he was included in the National Republican Congressional Committee's list of Republican candidates who qualified for fundraising help because they were thought to be particularly vulnerable.

Steve Harrison hoped to run against Fossella again in the 2008 election, but New York City Council member Domenic Recchia also began seeking the Democratic nomination.

For several days after his DWI arrest and his admission of an adulterous affair and fathering an out-of-wedlock child, Fossella gave indications that he might run for re-election despite these problems. On May 20, however, he dropped out of the race. Fossella was succeeded by Democrat Michael McMahon.

Committee assignments 
 Committee on Energy and Commerce
 Subcommittee on Commerce, Trade, and Consumer Protection
 Subcommittee on Environment and Hazardous Materials
 Subcommittee on Telecommunications and the Internet

Political positions 
In August 2002, appearing on CNN's Crossfire, Fossella argued for partly privatizing Social Security and allow some of the funds be placed on Wall Street investments. He said "I happen to think the President is on the right side of history here. And I think the more you empower American people, the more you give them the opportunity to invest on their own and being in control of their own destiny and their own retirement, the better off we'll be."

In June 2003, Fossella wrote an op-ed for the Washington Times, in which he said "The claims that progress is too slow, the situation unstable and the United States lacks the expertise to get the job done does not reflect reality on the ground in Baghdad, Kirkuk and beyond. Indeed, the critics who complain that the seeds of democracy will not take root in the sands of a desert where tyranny ruled are as wrong today as the pessimists were in 1945." The final sentence of the column was "The United States will fulfill its commitment to Iraq, and then we will depart, having liberated a nation, freed a people and established a democracy of the people, by the people and for the people." In August 2006, Fossella said that leaving Iraq now would "do a disservice to the noble sacrifice that the troops have made on behalf of our national security."

Fossella voted for the Marriage Protection Act in 2004, and for the Federal Marriage Amendment in 2004 and 2006, all of which would nationally define marriage as between a man and a woman. In 2007, Fossella voted for the  Employment Non-Discrimination Act, a bill nationally prohibiting job discrimination based on sexual orientation.

In 2005, Fossella spoke out against the Bush Administration's handling of appropriating Homeland Security funds.

After the 2007 State of the Union Address, Fossella crossed the aisle to join with Senator Hillary Clinton in 2007 to raise awareness of health issues suffered those who at worked at the World Trade Center site on and after 9/11. Fossella is quoted as saying "We have made progress over the last year to begin getting the resources necessary to help our 9/11 heroes. However, we now need a significant investment by the federal government into health monitoring and treatment for those who are sick or injured. In addition, the federal government must develop a comprehensive plan to address the health impacts of 9/11. We continue urging the White House to provide adequate funding in the 2008 budget to help all those who are sick or injured as a result of the terror attacks."

Legislative initiatives 
Fossella's legislative initiatives while in Congress included the following:

 Return over $700 million to individual investors by eliminating fees by the SEC with the Investor and Capital Markets Fee Relief Act. The Act was signed into law by President Bush on January 16, 2002.
 Help repair the 86th Street subway station in the Bay Ridge area of Brooklyn. This station serves as a transfer point where passengers connect to bus service to Staten Island over the Verrazano Bridge.

See also 
 List of federal political sex scandals in the United States

References

External links 
 Re-Elect Congressman Vito Fossella official campaign site
 
 Profile at SourceWatch
 Fossella's Mug Shot
 A chronicle the DWI Arrest of Vito Fossella
 Detailed map of New York's 13th Congressional District (pdf)
 

|-

|-

|-

1965 births
21st-century American male musicians
21st-century American politicians
21st-century American violinists
American accountants
American male violinists
American management consultants
American percussionists
American people of Irish descent
American radio DJs
American rock violinists
Catholics from New York (state)
Deloitte people
Fordham University School of Law alumni
Iona University alumni
Lawyers from New York City
Living people
Monsignor Farrell High School alumni
Musicians from New York (state)
New York City Council members
New York (state) lawyers
New York (state) politicians convicted of crimes
Performers of Christian rock music
Politicians from Staten Island
Republican Party members of the United States House of Representatives from New York (state)
Wharton School of the University of Pennsylvania alumni
People from Great Kills, Staten Island
People from Eltingville, Staten Island
American people of Italian descent
Members of Congress who became lobbyists